Snainton railway station was situated on the North Eastern Railway's Pickering to Seamer branch line.  It served the village of Snainton, North Yorkshire, England. The station opened to passenger traffic on 1 May 1882, and closed on 3 June 1950. Snainton railway station has also been restored and is currently in single ownership.

References

External links
 Snainton station on the Disused Stations website
 Snainton station on navigable 1947 O. S. map

Disused railway stations in the Borough of Scarborough
Former North Eastern Railway (UK) stations
Railway stations in Great Britain opened in 1882
Railway stations in Great Britain closed in 1950
Snainton